CFP-10 within bacterial proteins  (also known as ESAT-6-like protein esxB or secreted antigenic protein MTSA-10 or 10 kDa culture filtrate antigen CFP-10) is a protein that is encoded by the esxB gene.

CFP-10 is a 10 kDa secreted antigen from Mycobacterium tuberculosis.  It forms a 1:1 heterodimeric complex with ESAT-6.  Both genes are expressed from the RD1 region of the bacterial genome and play a key role in the virulence of the infection.

Function 
10-kDa culture filtrate protein (CFP-10) is an antigen that contributes to the virulence Mycobacterium tuberculosis.  CFP-10 forms a tight 1:1 heterodimeric complex with 6kDaA early secreted antigen target (ESAT-6).  In the mycobacterial cell, these two proteins are interdependent on each other for stability. The ESAT-6/CFP-10 complex is secreted by the ESX-1 secretion system, also known as the RD1 region. Mycobacterium tuberculosis uses this ESX-1 secretion system to deliver virulence factors into host macrophage and monocyte white blood cells during infection.
In Mycobacterium tuberculosis, the core components of the whole ESX-1 secretion system include Rv3877, and two AAA ATPases, including Rv3870 and Rv3871, a cytosolic protein. The ESAT-6/CFP-10 heterodimer complex is targeted for secretion by a C-terminal signal sequence on CFP-10 that is recognized by the cytosolic Rv3871 protein.  Rv3871 then interacts with the CFP-10 C-terminal, and escorts the ESAT-6/CFP-10 complex to Rv3870 and Rv3877, a multi-transmembrane protein which makes up the pore that spans the cytosolic membrane of the virulent host cell. Once ESAT-6/CFP-10 is next to the membrane of the virulent host cell, the CFP-10 C-terminal attaches and binds itself to the cells surface. The ESAT-6/CFP-10 complex’s secretion and attachment to the virulent host cell shows its contribution to the pathogenicity of Mycobacterium tuberculosis. [4].

Structure 
The 10-kDa culture filtrate protein (CFP-10) and 6kDaA early secreted antigen target (ESAT-6) complex is a 100 amino-acid sequence protein. ESAT-6/CFP-10 has a hydrophobic nature as well as a high content of α-helical structures. Resonance structure analysis of the complex reveals two similar helix-turn-helix hairpin structures formed by the individual proteins, which lie anti-parallel to each other and forms a four-helix bundle.  Its long flexible arm projecting off the four-helix bundle, formed by the seven amino-acid C-terminal of CFP-10, is essential for binding and attaching to the surface of host white blood cells; such as macrophages and monocytes.  If this C-terminus is cleaved off, the complex shows greatly reduced attachment ability.

See also
 QuantiFERON
 ESAT-6

References

Further reading 

 

Tuberculosis
Bacterial proteins